Daanish might refer to:

People
Daanish Zahid, convicted of the racially motivated murder of Kriss Donald (the first person to be convicted of racially motivated murder in Scotland)

Organisations
 Daanish Schools, an education project in Pakistan